Lluís Nonell (24 December 1926 – 30 January 1982) was a Spanish actor. He died during the play El diluvio que viene at Teatro Princesa on 30 January 1982 from a sudden cardiac death.

He played Guerau in El Misantrop in 1951, Verbagàlia in an unknown date, La bonna persona de Sezuan in 1965 and in 1966 Mª Els Pastorets at Teatre Romea in Barcelona.

He is the uncle of the dramaturg Ricard Reguant.

Filmography

Films

TV series

References

External links
 

1926 births
1982 deaths
Film directors from Catalonia
Male actors from Barcelona
Male stage actors from Catalonia